Morgan Jerkins (born 1992) is an American writer and editor. Her debut book, This Will Be My Undoing (2018), a collection of nonfiction essays, was a New York Times bestseller. Her second book, Wandering in Strange Lands, was released in August 2020. She is currently an adjunct professor at Columbia University.

Early life and education 
Jerkins was raised by her mother and grew up in a predominantly white neighborhood in New Jersey. She has an older sister, and is the niece of music producers Fred Jerkins III and Rodney Jerkins. She has Creole ancestry. She began writing at the age of 14 as an outlet for her experiences with bullying in school.

Jerkins received her bachelor's degree from Princeton University. She planned to move to New York after graduation, but had difficulty finding a job in the publishing industry despite her degree in comparative literature, for which she said she learned five languages. She attended the Bennington Writing Seminars for her MFA.

Career

Books 
Jerkins' first book This Will Be My Undoing: Living at the Intersection of Black, Female, and Feminist in (White) America was published on January 30, 2018, by Perennial/HarperCollins. The book is a nonfiction collection of essays including topics such as experiencing bullying as a child, feminism, dating, and attending Princeton as a Black student. The cover was inspired by one of the covers for Zora Neale Hurston's Their Eyes Were Watching God.

The book received mainly positive critical reception. Ilana Masad wrote in a review for the Los Angeles Times, "there is a brutal honesty Jerkins brings to the experiences of black girls and women that is vital for us to understand as we strive toward equality, toward believing women’s voices and experiences, and toward repairing the broken systems that have long defined our country." Roxane Gay stated in Elle, "This Will Be My Undoing is not a perfect book—there are places where I wanted her to push her conclusions further—but the prose resonates with the promise of a talented writer coming into her own." In a less positive review, Khanya Khandlo Mtshali wrote in Los Angeles Times Book Review, "Morgan Jerkins is an industrious writer whose success is undoubtedly a product of her work ethic and determination. But This Will Be My Undoing falls into the tradition of art that upholds an easy and showy moralism." The book received a starred review from Publishers Weekly and was a New York Times bestseller.

Her second book, Wandering in Strange Lands: A Daughter of the Great Migration Reclaims Her Roots was published in August 2020 under HarperCollins. It is a memoir of Jerkins' journey through several Southern states to answer long-held questions about her family's history. Kirkus Reviews described it as a "revelatory exploration of the meaning of blackness."

Other work 
Jerkins publishes nonfiction essays and is an editor. She was a senior editor for Zora, a culture website for women of color published by Medium. In January 2020, Jerkins led the assembly of The Zora Canon, a list of 100 great works by Black women writers. The list includes books published pre-Emancipation such as Our Nig (1859), up to those released in 2019. She left the position in February 2021, and was named senior culture editor of The Undefeated in March 2021.

In 2021, Morgan Jerkins appeared on Storybound  alongside the band French Cassettes.

Personal life 
Jerkins is a Christian. She resides in Harlem.

Works 

 This Will Be My Undoing: Living at the Intersection of Black, Female, and Feminist in (White) America (2018). 
 Wandering in Strange Lands: A Daughter of the Great Migration Reclaims Her Roots (2020). 
 Caul Baby: A Novel (2021).

References

External links 
Official website

1992 births
Living people
American editors
Princeton University alumni
Writers from New Jersey
Bennington College alumni
21st-century African-American women writers
21st-century African-American writers
Louisiana Creole people
21st-century American essayists
21st-century American women writers
American women essayists
American women editors
Columbia University faculty